Salcabamba (from Quechua Sallqa Pampa, meaning "wild plain") is one of sixteen districts of the Tayacaja Province  in the Huancavelica Region) of Peru.

Geography 
Other mountains are listed below:

Ethnic groups 
The people in the district are mainly Indigenous citizens of Quechua descent. Quechua is the language which the majority of the population (84.11%) learnt to speak in childhood, 15.49% of the residents started speaking using the Spanish language (2007 Peru Census).

References